Kokrajhar East Assembly constituency is one of the 126 assembly constituencies of  Assam a north east state of India.  Kokrajhar is also part of Kokrajhar Lok Sabha constituency.

Members of Legislative Assembly

 1967: Rani Manjula Devi, Indian National Congress
 1973: Sarat Chandra Sinha, Indian National Congress
 1978: Samar Brahma Choudhury, Plain Tribals Council of Assam
 1983: Dambarudhar Brahma, Indian National Congress
 1985: Charan Narzary, Plain Tribals Council of Assam
 1991: Pramila Rani Brahma, Independent
 1996: Pramila Rani Brahma, Independent
 2001: Pramila Rani Brahma, Independent
 2006: Pramila Rani Brahma, Independent
 2011: Pramila Rani Brahma, Bodoland People's Front
 2016: Pramila Rani Brahma, Bodoland People's Front
 2021: Lawrence Islary, United People's Party Liberal

Election results

2021 results

2016 results

See also

 Kokrajhar
 List of constituencies of Assam Legislative Assembly

References

External links 
 

Assembly constituencies of Assam
Kokrajhar